Cannabinol (CBN) is a mildly psychoactive cannabinoid that acts as a low affinity partial agonist at both CB1 and CB2 receptors. This activity at CB1 and CB2 receptors constitutes interaction of CBN with the endocannabinoid system (ECS).

CBN was the first cannabis compound to be isolated from cannabis extract in the late 1800s. Its structure and chemical synthesis were achieved by 1940, followed by some of the first basic research studies to determine the effects of individual cannabis-derived compounds in vivo. Although CBN shares the same mechanism of action as other phytocannabinoids (e.g., delta-9 tetrahydrocannabinol or D9THC), it has a lower affinity for CB1 receptors, meaning that much higher doses of CBN are required in order to experience effects, such as mild sedation.

Chemical structure 
Cannabinoid receptor agonists are categorized into four groups based on chemical structure. CBN, as one of the many phytocannabinoids derived from Cannabis Sativa L, is considered a classical cannabinoid. Other examples of compounds in this group include dibenzopyran derivatives such as D9THC, well-known for underlying the subjective “high” experienced by cannabis users, as well as D8THC, and their synthetic analogs. In contrast, endogenously produced cannabinoids (i.e., endocannabinoids), which also exert effects through CB agonism, are considered eicosanoids, distinguished by notable differences in chemical structure.

Compared to D9THC, one additional aromatic ring confers CBN with a slower and more limited metabolic profile - see CBN Formation & Metabolism, below. In contrast to THC, CBN has no double bond isomers nor stereoisomers. CBN can degrade into HU-345 from oxidation. In the case of oral administration of CBN, first-pass metabolism in the liver involves the addition of a hydroxyl group at C9 or C11, increasing the affinity and specificity of CBN for both CB1 and CB2 receptors (see 11-OH-CBN).

Synthesis and metabolism 
This diagram represents the biosynthetic and metabolic pathways by which phytocannabinoids (e.g., CBD, THC, CBN) are created in the cannabis plant. Starting with CBG-A, the acidic forms of certain phytocannabinoids are generated via enzymatic conversion. From there, decarboxylation (i.e., catalyzed by combustion or heat) yields the most well-known metabolites present in the cannabis plant. CBN is unique in that it does not arise from a pre-existing acidic form, but rather is generated through the oxidation of THC.

CBN is unique among phytocannabinoids in that its biosynthetic pathway involves conversion directly from D9THC, rather than from an acidic precursor form of CBN (e.g., D9THC arises through decarboxylation of THC-A). CBN can be found in trace amounts in the Cannabis plant, found mostly in cannabis that is aged and stored, allowing for CBN formation through the oxidation of the cannabis plant's main psychoactive and intoxicating chemical, tetrahydrocannabinol (THC). This process of oxidation occurs via exposure to heat, oxygen, and/or light. Although reports are limited, CBN-A has also been measured at very low levels in the cannabis plant, thought to have formed via hydrolyzation of THC-A (see Phytocannabinoid Biosynthesis diagram, below).

When administered orally, CBN demonstrates a similar metabolism to D9THC, with the primary active metabolite produced through the hydrolyzation of C9 as part of first-pass metabolism in the liver. The active metabolite generated via this process is called 11-OH-CBN, which is 2x as potent as CBN, and has demonstrated activity as a weak CB2 antagonist. This metabolism starkly contrasts that of D9THC in terms of potency, given that 11-OH-THC has been reported to have 10x the potency of D9THC.

Due to high lipophilicity and first-pass metabolism, there is low bioavailability of CBN and other cannabinoids following oral administration. CBN metabolism is mediated in part by CYP450 isoforms 2C9 and 3A4. The metabolism of CBN may be catalyzed by UGTs (UDP-Glucuronosyltransferases), with a subset of UGT isoforms (1A7, 1A8, 1A9, 1A10, 2B7) identified as potential substrates associated with CBN glucuronidation. The bioavailability of CBN following administration via inhalation (e.g., smoking or vaporizing) is approximately 40% that of intravenous administration.

Pharmacology 

CBN was the first cannabis compound to be isolated from cannabis extract in the late 1800s. Its structure and chemical synthesis were achieved by 1940, followed by some of the first preclinical research studies to determine the effects of individual cannabis-derived compounds in vivo.

Both THC and CBN activate the CB1 (Ki = 211.2 nM) and CB2 (Ki = 126.4 nM) receptors. Each compound acts as a low affinity partial agonist at CB1 receptors with THC demonstrating 10-13x greater affinity to the CB1 receptor. Compared to THC, CBN has an equivalent or higher affinity to CB2 receptors, which are located throughout the central and peripheral nervous system, but are primarily associated with immune function. CB2 receptors are known to be located on immune cells throughout the body, including macrophages, T cells, and B cells. These immune cells have been shown to decrease production of immune-related chemical signals (e.g., cytokines) or undergo apoptosis as a consequence of CB2 agonism by CBN. In cell culture, CBN demonstrates antimicrobial effects, particularly in instances of antibiotic-resistant bacteria. CBN has also been reported to act as an ANKTM1 channel agonist at high concentrations (>20nM). While some phytocannabinoids have been shown to interact with nociceptive and immune-related signaling via transient receptor potential channels (e.g., TRPV1 and TRPM8), there is currently limited evidence to suggest that CBN acts in this way. In preclinical rodent studies, CBN, anandamide and other CB1 agonists have demonstrated inhibitory effects on GI motility, reversible via CB1R blockade (i.e., antagonism).

In considering the efficacy of cannabis-based products, there remains controversy surrounding a concept termed “the entourage effect”. This concept describes a widely-reported but poorly-understood synergistic effect of certain cannabinoids when phytocannabinoids are coadministered with other naturally-occurring chemical compounds in the cannabis plant (e.g., flavonoids, terpenoids, alkaloids). This entourage effect is often cited to explain the superior efficacy observed in some studies of whole-plant-derived cannabis therapeutics as compared to isolated or synthesized individual cannabis constituents.

Putative receptor targets 
The table highlights several common cannabinoids along with putative receptor targets and therapeutic properties. Exogenous (plant-derived) phytocannabinoids are identified with an asterisk while remaining chemicals represent well-known endocannabinoids (i.e., endogenously-produced cannabinoid receptor ligands).

Neurotransmitter interactions 

In the brain, the canonical mechanism of CB1 receptor activation is a form of short-term synaptic plasticity initiated via retrograde signaling of endogenous CB1 agonists such as 2AG or AEA (two primary endocannabinoids). This mechanism of action is called depolarization-induced suppression of inhibition (DSI) or depolarization-induced suppression of excitation (DSE), depending on the classification of the presynaptic neuron acted upon by the retrograde messenger (see diagram at left). In the case of CB1R agonism on the presynaptic membrane of a GABAergic interneuron, activation leads to a net effect of increased activity, while the same activity on a glutamatergic neuron leads to the opposite net effect. The release of other neurotransmitters is also modulated in this way, particularly dopamine, dynorphin, oxytocin, and vasopressin.

Pharmacokinetics 
A small study of six cannabis users found a highly variable half life of 32 +/- 17 hours upon intravenous administration. Similar to CBD, CBN is metabolized by the CYP2C9 and CYP3A4 liver enzymes and thus the half-life is sensitive to genetic factors that effect the levels of these enzymes.

Legal status
CBN is not listed in the schedules set out by the United Nations' Single Convention on Narcotic Drugs from 1961 nor their Convention on Psychotropic Substances from 1971, so the signatory countries to these international drug control treaties are not required by these treaties to control CBN.

United States
According to the 2018 Farm Bill, extracts from the Cannabis sativa L. plant, including CBN, are legal under US federal law as long as they have a delta-9 Tetrahydrocannabinol (THC) concentration of 0.3 percent or less.  and sales or possession of CBN could potentially be prosecuted under the Federal Analogue Act.

References

External links 

 Erowid Compounds found in Cannabis sativa

Phytocannabinoids
Natural phenols
Benzochromenes
CB1 receptor agonists
CB2 receptor agonists